Sara Johnsen (born 4 March 1970) is a Norwegian film director and author.

Career
Johnsen's first feature film Kissed by Winter was nominated for the 2005 Nordic Council Film Prize. 
Johnsen was an additional writer on the first series of the television series Occupied (2015). In 2020, she created and wrote the series 22 juli about the Utoya mass shooting with her husband Pål Sletaune. At the Göteborg Film Festival she was awarded the 2020 Nordic TV Drama Screenplay Award for her work on 22 juli. She was awarded the Fritt Ord Honorary Award in 2020, along with Pål Sletaune.

Johnsen has written the novels White Man and He Knows Something She Can Try.

Selected filmography

Awards
The Kanon Award (2006)
Amanda Award (2010)
Fritt Ord Honorary Award (2020)

References

External links 

1970 births
Living people
Norwegian film directors
Norwegian women film directors